"What About Me" is a song written by Scott McKenzie, and recorded by Canadian singer Anne Murray.  The song was originally released on her 1968 album, What About Me. A live version appeared on her 1973 album Danny's Song, and this version was released as a single in 1973, which reached No. 1 on the Canadian Adult Contemporary chart and #2 on both the Canadian Country chart and the U.S. Adult Contemporary chart. The song was produced by Brian Ahern.

The song had been covered by many artists, including Joni Mitchell, Ian and Sylvia, Ken Tobias, and John Denver.

Chart performance

Anne Murray

References

1968 debut singles
1973 singles
Songs written by Scott McKenzie
Anne Murray songs
Joni Mitchell songs
John Denver songs
Song recordings produced by Brian Ahern (producer)
Capitol Records singles
1968 songs